Navarathinam is a 1977 Indian Tamil-language road film, written and directed by A. P. Nagarajan, his final film. It stars M. G. Ramachandran, Latha, Jayachitra and Zarina Wahab. The film was released on 5 March 1977, and failed commercially.

Plot 
Thangam, lives up to his name as Golden hearted person, leaves his house in search of a future. He comes across nine different women from different statuses in life and they all fall in love with him and help him. He first meets Manikkam who is a kurathi who falls in love with him and who he falls in love with. He then meets Pushpa who is a stage performer whom he saves but turns down her proposal and moves on. Then he meets Maragadam, Muthamma, Gomaidi and his journey continues. He meets and reforms a prostitute Vairam. He meets a hipster Neela to whom he shows how deep and valuable our culture is. He finally meets Pavalai and Vayiduriam before getting married to Manikkam in the end.

Cast 
Lead actor
M. G. Ramachandran as Thangam

Lead actresses
Latha as Manikkam
Zarina Wahab as Pushpa
P. R. Varalakshmi as Maragadam
Shubha as Muthamma
Jaya as Gomaidi
Sripriya as Vairam
Y. Vijaya as Neela
Jayachitra as Pavalai
Kumari Padmini as Vayiduriyam

Supporting actresses
S. Varalakshmi as Thangam's mother
C. K. Saraswathi as Sagunan
S. N. Lakshmi as Pangajethamma
Puspalatha as Pavalai's sister

Supporting actors
A. V. M. Rajan as Raja
M. N. Nambiar as Dharmaseelan
P. S. Veerappa as Manaru
Nagesh as Ratnam
Thengai Srinivasan as Muthamma's father
C. R. Parthiban as IG of Police
K. Kannan as Gunaseelan
M. B. Shetty as Djagou
Senthamarai as Police inspector
Isari Velan as  Pavalai's uncle
Shanmugasundari as Tripurasundari / Pimpstress
Ennathe Kannaiah as Villager
Oru Viral Krishna Rao as The worker of teashop
Loose Mohan as House broker
T. K. S. Natarajan as Housekeeper

Production 
Navarathinam was A. P. Nagarajan's final film, as well as his only film with M. G. Ramachandran. Considering the poor financial plight of Nagarajan, Ramachandran acted in the film without taking any remuneration and concentrated on minimal budget, by shooting all the scenes in his Sathya Studios, without outdoor shoots. Zarina Wahab initially suggested her friend Vijaya for one of the female lead roles, but Ramachandran refused; Wahab herself was chosen.

Soundtrack 
The music was composed by Kunnakudi Vaidyanathan. The song "Ladke Se Mili Ladki", written by Bollywood lyricist P. L. Santoshi, consists predominantly of Hindi lyrics.

Release and reception 
Navarathinam was released on 5 March 1977. Kanthan of Kalki negatively reviewed the film, criticising Nagarajan's execution of an innovative story. Ananda Vikatan called the film a "a march of nine gems", noting that though the story was subpar, there was amusement. The film failed commercially; according to historian Sachi Sri Kantha, a potential reason was that the plot was strung around "national unity" as a political propaganda for Ramachandran's newly formed party and it's then ally Indira Gandhi's Congress Party, prior to the 1977 Indian general election.

References

External links 
 

1970s Tamil-language films
1977 films
Films directed by A. P. Nagarajan
Films with screenplays by A. P. Nagarajan
Films scored by Kunnakudi Vaidyanathan
Indian road movies